Brust (from Middle High German Brust "chest" "breast") is a surname.

People
Barry Brust (born 1983), Canadian ice hockey player
Ben Brust (born 1991), American basketball player
Leo Joseph Brust (1916–1995), American Roman Catholic bishop
Peter Brust (1869–1946), American architect
Preston Brust, member of LoCash
Steven Brust (born 1955), American writer

Fictional
Ben Brust, character in the novel Subterranean

See also
Kasten-brust armour
Surnames from nicknames

German-language surnames